Journal of Engineering may refer to
Journal of Engineering (IET journal), abbreviated J. Eng. (Stevenage), published by the Institution of Engineering and Technology
Journal of Engineering (Hindawi journal), published by Hindawi
Journal of Engineering, published by the College of Engineering of the University of Baghdad